Blake Edwards (born 26 October 1999) is an Australian cricketer. He made his first-class debut on 12 November 2019, for Queensland in the 2019–20 Sheffield Shield season. In January 2020, he was named in the Cricket Australia XI team to face the England Lions. In June 2020, he was upgraded to a full contract for Queensland ahead of the 2020–21 domestic season.

References

External links
 

1999 births
Living people
Australian cricketers
Cricket Australia XI cricketers
Queensland cricketers
Place of birth missing (living people)